Igor Nikolaevich Polianski (born 20 March 1967 in Novosibirsk) is a former backstroke swimmer from the USSR. He is married and has a son and a daughter living in New Zealand.

Polianski trained at Dynamo in Novosibirsk. In 1986 he became the Honoured Master of Sports of the USSR. From 1985 to 1990 Polianski was a member of the USSR National Team. He won three medals at the 1988 Summer Olympics in Seoul, South Korea, including the gold in the 200 m backstroke. Polianski won gold medals at the 1986 World Aquatics Championships in 100 m backstroke and 200 m backstroke and a bronze medal in 4×100 m medley.

On 3 March 1985 in Erfurt, GDR, Polianski set the new world record in 200 m backstroke at 1:58.14, that stood six years. Three years later he improved world record time in 100 m backstroke three times: first on 15 March and 16 March in Tallinn, USSR, to 55.17 and 55.16 respectively and then on 16 July in Moscow to 55.00. The latter was beaten by David Berkoff a month later.

In 1989 Polianski graduated from Omsk State Institute of Physical Culture. He currently resides in New Zealand and currently runs a swimming school – Waterlions, in partnership with his wife. He is an active member of the Auckland Swimming Community, coaching from the Epsom Girls Grammar and Massey High School campuses.

See also
 List of members of the International Swimming Hall of Fame
 World record progression 100 metres backstroke
 World record progression 200 metres backstroke

References

 databaseOlympics

1967 births
Living people
Russian male swimmers
Male backstroke swimmers
Olympic swimmers of the Soviet Union
Soviet male swimmers
Honoured Masters of Sport of the USSR
Dynamo sports society athletes
Swimmers at the 1988 Summer Olympics
Olympic gold medalists for the Soviet Union
Olympic bronze medalists for the Soviet Union
Russian expatriates in New Zealand
Sportspeople from Novosibirsk
Russian swimming coaches
World record setters in swimming
Olympic bronze medalists in swimming
World Aquatics Championships medalists in swimming
European Aquatics Championships medalists in swimming
Medalists at the 1988 Summer Olympics
Olympic gold medalists in swimming
Universiade medalists in swimming
Universiade gold medalists for the Soviet Union
Medalists at the 1985 Summer Universiade